Bahattin Köse (born 26 August 1990) is a Turkish professional footballer who plays as a striker or right winger for Ankaraspor.

Career 
Köse began his career with TuS Wischerhöfen and signed in summer 2008 for Rot Weiss Ahlen. He made his professional debut in a DFB-Pokal match on 22 September 2009 against SpVgg Greuther Fürth. On 6 October 2009, Köse signed his first professional contract. In summer 2011, he switched teams and joined Arminia Bielefeld.

In May 2012, Köse signed with R.A.E.C. Mons in the Belgian First Division A, on a two-year contract. He moved to Turkey for Süper Lig side Akhisar Belediyespor on 31 January 2014.

References

External links
 
 

1990 births
People from Ahlen
Sportspeople from Münster (region)
Footballers from North Rhine-Westphalia
Living people
Turkish footballers
Association football forwards
Rot Weiss Ahlen players
Arminia Bielefeld players
R.A.E.C. Mons players
Akhisarspor footballers
Altınordu F.K. players
Manisaspor footballers
Adanaspor footballers
Samsunspor footballers
Kocaelispor footballers
Ankaraspor footballers
2. Bundesliga players
3. Liga players
Oberliga (football) players
Belgian Pro League players
Süper Lig players
TFF First League players
TFF Second League players
Turkish expatriate footballers
Expatriate footballers in Belgium
Turkish expatriate sportspeople in Belgium